Hop-Up may refer to:

Hop-up (airsoft)
Hop-up (TT-01) (Aftermarket optional gear parts)